Helēna Ringa (born 9 June 1947) is a Latvian athlete. She competed in the women's long jump at the 1968 Summer Olympics, representing the Soviet Union.

References

1947 births
Living people
Athletes (track and field) at the 1968 Summer Olympics
Latvian female long jumpers
Olympic athletes of the Soviet Union
Place of birth missing (living people)
Soviet female long jumpers